Francis Henry Roberts (19 October 1784 – 9 May 1809) a servant of the East India Company in 1804, who notoriously disappeared while on service in India.

Early life

Although little is known about his early life, it is believed he was the son Henry Roberts, a wool merchant based in Lavenham, Suffolk. At the age of 13 he attended Tonbridge School then went on to study law at Magdalene College, Cambridge. He was asked to leave Cambridge and then went on to pursue a career in the stock market in London.

East India Company

A failed career in stock broking led Francis to further his career abroad and he enlisted as a civil servant in the East India Company. He worked initially in Bombay overseeing the import of goods required by the British community in Bombay. He was then later reposted to Madras, allegedly over charges of theft which were later unsubstantiated.

Disappearance and supposed death

From his school days Roberts had always been interested in anthropology, looking particularly at primitive tribes and their settlements. It was to this end that he ended up during a months leave in the hill station of Ooty. Not only did this town boast a more agreeable climate it was also home to several tribal groups, which sparked Roberts' interest. Following several weeks of apparently happy research in the Nilgiris Hills, Francis and his local guide failed to return to his lodgings in Ooty, having last been seen on the morning of 9 May 1809. The alarm was not raised until the next day, and search party was dispatched without any success. In the wake of the incidence rumours spread quickly about his death, from sacrificial slaughter to murder. Stories ran for several weeks in the Indian newspapers and appeals were made to his whereabouts, the only response suggesting Thugee involvement. It was eventually ruled by the Magistrate of Chennai that he was taken by a wild animal, although some doubt still remains because both he and his guide were armed with blunderbusses.

British East India Company people
People from Lavenham
1784 births
1809 deaths
People educated at Tonbridge School
Alumni of Magdalene College, Cambridge